Gorr the God Butcher is a supervillain appearing in American comic books published by Marvel Comics. Created by Jason Aaron and Esad Ribic, Gorr first appeared in Thor: God of Thunder #1 (January 2013).

Gorr The God Butcher has been described as one of Marvel's most notable and powerful male supervillains, being labelled as one of Thor's greatest foes.

The character made his live-action debut in the Marvel Cinematic Universe (MCU) film Thor: Love and Thunder (2022), portrayed by Christian Bale.

Publication history
Jason Aaron and Esad Ribic decided to relaunch the Thor franchise during the Marvel NOW! initiative. Gorr first appeared in Thor: God of Thunder #1 (January 2013).

Fictional character biography
Gorr grew up on a nameless barren planet where earthquakes, lack of water, and wild animals are common. No gods helped his people, but they still trusted blindly in their faith. When his mother, mate, and children died, he thought gods could not exist, and because of that, he was outcast by his tribe. When he learned gods did exist but did not help those in need, such as his dying family, he vowed to kill them all. He then acquired All-Black the Necrosword from Knull after witnessing Knull in combat with a golden god. He eventually finds young Thor Odinson on Earth in Medieval Iceland. He nearly killed the God of Thunder, but a band of Vikings came to assist him in their battle. While Gorr escaped with his arm cut off, he soon learned he needed help, so he created an army of shadow berserkers, then slowly and quietly eliminated more and more gods. Eventually, in the present day, Thor noticed the missing gods and investigated their disappearances. This brought Gorr and Thor to another battle, but Gorr then teleported into the future, spending centuries resuming his campaign against the gods. By the time Thor followed Gorr into the future, his aged counterpart was the last Asgardian defending the realm against the shadow berserkers. Gorr also brings the young Thor into the future, where his wife and children have seemingly been resurrected, as he is about to set off the Godbomb, wanting to force the Thor who originally defeated him to witness the results of his efforts. Young Thor escapes and joins forces with his other selves to mount a new attack, but this assault fails and all three Thors are captured. However, when Gorr kills his wife for calling him her god, Gorr's "son", actually a construct made out of All-Black the Necrosword, releases Thor the Avenger from captivity and asks him to kill his father, observing that the man his father was once would be horrified at what he has become. As Thor dives into the heart of the Godbomb wielding both his Mjolnir and the Mjolnir of his older self, the prayers of all the gods from across time give Thor the power to absorb the blast. Thor from the present then uses the two Mjolnirs to kill Gorr.

Gorr's legacy returns to haunt Thor when Nick Fury – currently wielding the eye and knowledge of the murdered Uatu following the "Original Sin" storyline – whispers a secret to him that causes Thor to lose the ability to wield his hammer. After spending months tormented by that secret, refusing to share it with anyone else, Thor finally reveals to Beta Ray Bill that the secret was "Gorr was right", affirming to Bill that he now believes that Gorr was correct that the universe would have been better without gods. Despite that, Bill assures Thor that his willingness to keep fighting for others even without his hammer shows that he is more than a god.

Millions of years into the future, Gorr is resurrected through the Necrosword by Loki in order to kill Thor. More powerful than ever, Gorr attempts to destroy the universe, but is depowered by Thor and driven insane, sent to live out the rest of his now-mortal life on Indigarr.

Powers and abilities

All-Black the Necrosword 

Gorr is a mortal who does not have superhuman abilities. He later enters in possession of the symbiotic weapon "All-Black the Necrosword," which according to Galactus, "carved the first dawn from the stone of the endless night." The blade was forged by Knull, the progenitor of the Klyntar species, using the head of a slain Celestial. The blade is later banished into a black hole, but an elderly King Thor uses it to battle Galactus.

Bonding with "All-Black the Necrosword" provides various superpowers to the one who wields it. The sword grants superhuman strength, durability, speed, and reflexes. The blade lets its user create different constructs, such as wings allowing the user flight at extreme speeds, magical weapons, sharp tendrils that can kill any god, including Asgardians, and a shroud of Berserkers constructed out of darkness. The sword grants virtual immortality. It allows its wielder to recover quickly from injuries. With the sword, Gorr also created the Godbomb, an anti-divinity armament designed to kill every god who had existed or ever would exist. Additionally, each time a god is slain by the blade, it provides more power to its wielder.

Reception

Critical reception 
Darby Harn of Screen Rant called Gorr one of Thor's "very powerful and very well-regarded villains," writing, "Gorr The God Butcher is a popular villain with fans in large measure because of how successful he was. He lived up to his name by killing most of the gods of the Marvel Universe, leaving an older Thor virtually alone on the throne of Asgard in a dark future. Gorr is one of Thor's coolest comic book villains in recent years, with a ghostly look and a weapon, the Necrosword, that has a connection to the alien symbiote that spawned Venom."

Accolades 

 In 2015, Screen Rant included Gorr in their "20 Most Powerful Marvel Villains" list.
 In 2018, CBR.com ranked Gorr 15th in their "Marvel's 20 Strongest Villains" list.
 In 2018, ComicsVerse ranked Gorr 10th in their "Top 10 Most Formidable Thor Villains" list.
 In 2020, CBR.com ranked Gorr 7th in their "20 Of Thor's Strongest Villains Ranked From Weakest To Most Powerful" list.
 In 2021, Screen Rant included Gorr in their "Thor Comics: 5 Heroes Fans Hated (& 5 Villains They Loved)" list.
 In 2022, Digital Trends ranked Gorr 12th in their "Every Marvel villain ranked from worst to best" list.
 In 2022, The A.V. Club ranked Gorr 14th in their "28 best Marvel villains" list.
 In 2022, Screen Rant included Gorr in their "10 Most Powerful Thor Villains, In The Movies & Comics" list and in their "17 Best Thor Villains From The Comics, Ranked Lamest To Coolest" list.

In other media

Film
 Some elements of Gorr's character were previously used for Hela (portrayed by Cate Blanchett) in the Marvel Cinematic Universe (MCU) film Thor: Ragnarok (2017).
 Gorr the God Butcher appears in the MCU film Thor: Love and Thunder (2022), portrayed by Christian Bale. This version has a more human-like appearance, only having white skin reminiscent of his comic book counterpart. In addition, it was the Necrosword who chose him as its wielder in retaliation for losing his daughter Love (portrayed by India Hemsworth) and his prayers to his god Rapu being left unanswered, corrupting him. In his quest to kill all gods, Gorr attacks Thor and steals his axe Stormbreaker to reach Eternity, despite the Necrosword slowly killing him. After Jane Foster / Mighty Thor destroys the Necrosword and a final battle with Thor, Gorr, freed of its influence, readily sees the error of his ways, and asks Eternity to bring Love back before he dies. With Gorr dead, Thor raises Love to be a Viking warrior.

Video games
 Gorr the God Butcher appears as a playable character in Marvel: Future Fight.

References

External links
 
 Gorr the God Butcher at ComicVine
 Gorr The God Butcher at DynamicsArts
 Gorr  at Comic Book Database

Characters created by Jason Aaron
Comics characters introduced in 2013
Fictional characters with immortality
Fictional characters with superhuman durability or invulnerability
Fictional mass murderers
Fictional swordfighters in comics
Fictional deicides
Marvel Comics aliens
Marvel Comics characters with accelerated healing
Marvel Comics characters with superhuman strength
Marvel Comics extraterrestrial supervillains
Marvel Comics supervillains
Marvel Comics male supervillains
Thor (Marvel Comics)